Sphingobacterium yanglingense is a Gram-negative and non-motile bacterium from the genus of Sphingobacterium which has been isolated from the root nodule surface of a soybean (Glycine max) in Yangling in China.

References

External links
Type strain of Sphingobacterium yanglingense at BacDive -  the Bacterial Diversity Metadatabase	

Sphingobacteriia
Bacteria described in 2014